Area code 423 is a telephone area code in the North American Numbering Plan for the U.S. state of Tennessee. It comprises two disconnected areas of East Tennessee that are separated by area code 865.

Principal cities in the northern part of the area code region are Morristown, Greeneville, Kingsport, Johnson City, and Bristol (more commonly known as the Tri-Cities region). The principal cities in the south are Chattanooga and Cleveland.

History
When the North American Numbering Plan was created in 1947, Tennessee was a single numbering plan area (NPA) with area code 901. In 1954, 901 was reduced to West Tennessee, while the rest of the state received area code 615.

In 1995, the eastern portion of 615, including Knoxville, Chattanooga, and the Tri-Cities, was split off as area code 423. This was the first new area code in the state in 41 years.

The boundary between 423 and 615 roughly followed the line between the Eastern and Central time zones; generally, Tennessee's share of the Eastern Time Zone was in 423.  As a result, the state's three area codes were roughly coextensive with the traditional Grand Divisions of Tennessee. The new 423 served almost all of East Tennessee, with 615 serving Middle Tennessee and 901 serving West Tennessee.

The Tennessee Regulatory Authority intended this configuration to be a long-term solution. However, within only three years, 423 was already close to exhaustion due to the proliferation of cell phones and pagers, particularly in Knoxville and Chattanooga. It soon became apparent that East Tennessee needed another area code, even though this would have forced many residents and businesses to change their numbers for the second time in a decade.

It was decided to create area code 865 for Knoxville and most of the central portion of East Tennessee effective November 1, 1999. Permissive dialing of 423 continued across East Tennessee until April 22, 2000. When the plans were being drawn up for the split, it was discovered that the Tri-Cities had too much traffic to follow Knoxville into 865, but were not large enough for their own area code through a three-way split. This left the Tennessee Regulatory Authority with two options–a split plan that would create two non-contiguous sections of 423, or turn 865 into an overlay for all of East Tennessee. The Tennessee Regulatory Authority went with the first option, since overlays were a new concept at the time, and had encountered some resistance due to the need for ten-digit dialing.

Normal practice would have called for Knoxville to retain 423, as it was the largest city in the old 423 territory. However, the Tennessee Regulatory Authority asked for the Knoxville numbering plan area to receive 865 because on an alpha-numeric telephone keypad, those numbers correspond to VOL (Volunteers) the nickname for the sports teams at the University of Tennessee.

This created one of the few area codes in the nation that is not contiguous, as 865 is almost entirely surrounded by 423 except on the east. Although this seemed to be a temporary solution, the North American Numbering Plan Administration initially determined that the reconfigured 423 would not be exhausted until around 2010.  However, with the 2002 implementation of number pooling in the southern portion of the area code (the Chattanooga area), the Tennessee Regulatory Authority now projects that 423 will remain in its unusual, non-contiguous state until at least 2027.

References

External links 

 List of exchanges from AreaCodeDownload.com, 423 Area Code

1995 establishments in Tennessee
423
423